Dirk Riechmann (born 12 May 1965) is a retired German football midfielder.

References

External links
 

1965 births
Living people
Sportspeople from Bochum
German footballers
Bundesliga players
2. Bundesliga players
VfL Bochum players
VfL Bochum II players
SC Preußen Münster players
Wuppertaler SV players
SpVgg Erkenschwick players
Association football midfielders
Footballers from North Rhine-Westphalia